Wilfred R. "Pop" Goodwin (December 22, 1920 – May 17, 2005) was an American professional basketball player. He spent two seasons in the Basketball Association of America (BAA) as a member of the Providence Steamrollers from 1946 to 1948.

BAA career statistics

Regular season

External links

1920 births
2005 deaths
American Basketball League (1925–1955) players
American men's basketball players
Centers (basketball)
Forwards (basketball)
Providence Steamrollers players
Sheboygan Red Skins players

Sportspeople from Brooklyn
Basketball players from New York City